Florence Gauvain (born 25 March 1962) is a French former professional tennis player.

Gauvain had a career high singles ranking of 297 and appeared three times in the qualifying draw for the French Open.

On the WTA Tour, Gauvain made two main draw appearance at the Clarins Open in Paris. In 1988 she won her first round match (over Louise Field) and in 1989 she took the fifth seed Bettina Fulco to three sets in a first round loss.

Both her husband Hervé Gauvain and daughter Sybille Gauvain have played professional tennis.

ITF finals

Singles: 1 (0–1)

References

External links
 
 

1962 births
Living people
French female tennis players